Lee Sang-Eun (born March 5, 1975) is a former South Korean handball player who competed in the 1996, 2000, and 2004 Summer Olympics.

In 1996 she was part of the South Korean team which won the silver medal. She played five matches and scored 14 goals.

Four years later she was part of the South Korean team which finished fourth in the 2000 Olympic tournament. She played all seven matches and scored 59 goals.

In 2004, she won the silver medal with the South Korean team again. She played all seven matches and scored 44 goals.

External links
Profile at databaseolympics.com (archived)

1975 births
Living people
People from Imsil County
South Korean female handball players
Olympic handball players of South Korea
Handball players at the 1996 Summer Olympics
Handball players at the 2000 Summer Olympics
Handball players at the 2004 Summer Olympics
Olympic silver medalists for South Korea
Olympic medalists in handball
Asian Games medalists in handball
Handball players at the 1994 Asian Games
Handball players at the 1998 Asian Games
Medalists at the 2004 Summer Olympics
Medalists at the 1996 Summer Olympics
Asian Games gold medalists for South Korea
Medalists at the 1994 Asian Games
Medalists at the 1998 Asian Games
Expatriate handball players
South Korean expatriate sportspeople in Denmark
South Korean expatriate sportspeople in Spain
Sportspeople from North Jeolla Province